The Sylvanus N. Staples House is a historic house located at 21 Second Street in Taunton, Massachusetts.

Description and history

The Greek Revival style, -story, wood-framed house was built in 1837 by Sylvanus Staples, a leading merchant of the Weir Village area of Taunton. Staples (1811-1893) went to sea as a young man, and was by the 1830s a successful merchant, dealing in flour and groceries. He greatly expanded is business during the 19th century, and died in this house in 1893.

The house was listed on the National Register of Historic Places on July 5, 1984.

See also
National Register of Historic Places listings in Taunton, Massachusetts

References

Houses in Taunton, Massachusetts
National Register of Historic Places in Taunton, Massachusetts
Houses on the National Register of Historic Places in Bristol County, Massachusetts
Houses completed in 1837
Greek Revival houses in Massachusetts